The Super Copa Gaúcha, was a tournament organized by the FGF during 2013 to 2016 reuniting the winners of Copa Metropolitana, Copa Serrana (Copa Norte), Copa Sul-Fronteira (Copa Sul), and Copa FGF. The winner of the competition won the classification for the Copa do Brasil of the next season, and for the Recopa Gaúcha.

List of champions

Following is the list with all the champions of the Super Copa Gaúcha.

References

External links
 Federação Gaúcha de Futebol

Football competitions in Rio Grande do Sul